Suntop Lookout (also Sun Top) is located on Suntop Mountain in Mount Baker-Snoqualmie National Forest in central Washington, USA. The fire lookout is at an elevation of about  overlooking the valleys of the White River and Huckleberry Creek just to the north of Mount Rainier National Park. Built to standard U.S. Forest Service plans, the one-story ground-level lookout measures fourteen by fourteen feet. The frame structure is capped by a pyramidal roof, and features large windows on all four sides with pivoting shutters that act as sunshades.

The Suntop lookout was built in either 1932 or 1933 to standard plans for an "L-4 Lookout House." It is one of two intact lookouts from the period in the former Snoqualmie National Forest. The lookout was used during World War II in the U.S. Army Aircraft Warning System. It is open to the public in summer months.

The lookout was listed on the National Register of Historic Places on July 14, 1987.

In Popular Culture
A work within the SCP Foundation universe, SCP-3333, is primarily set at Suntop Lookout.

References

External links

 Sun Top Lookout at Mt. Baker-Snoqualmie National Forest
 Suntop Lookout at National Geographic Traveler
 Suntop Lookout at the Historic American Buildings Survey, 35 images, 17 data pages, 4 photo caption pages

National Register of Historic Places in Pierce County, Washington
Government buildings completed in 1933
Towers completed in 1933
Buildings and structures in Pierce County, Washington
Fire lookout towers on the National Register of Historic Places in Washington (state)